
Year 488 BC was a year of the pre-Julian Roman calendar. At the time, it was known as the Year of the Consulship of Rutilus and Furius (or, less frequently, year 266 Ab urbe condita). The denomination 488 BC for this year has been used since the early medieval period, when the Anno Domini calendar era became the prevalent method in Europe for naming years.

Events 

 By place 

 Sicily 
 Theron becomes tyrant of Acragas in Sicily.

 Rome 
 Gaius Marcius Coriolanus and Attius Tullus Aufidius, leading an army of the Volsci, besiege Rome.  Coriolanus' mother and wife convince him to break off the siege.  In recognition of the service of these women, a temple is erected in Rome dedicated to Fortuna. Subsequently, the Volsci and their allies the Aequi have a falling out, and their armies fight as a result, significantly diminishing the strength of each of them.

 Greece 
 Astylos of Croton wins the stadion race at the 73rd Olympic Games.

Births

Deaths

References

Sources